Hytracc Consulting AS is a design and implementation service provider 
for IT solutions assisting oil and gas companies in 
managing their hydrocarbon exploration supply chain. The company is 
headquartered in Stavanger, Norway, and also has offices in 
Aberdeen, Calgary, Groningen, Houston, Trondheim, and 
Kuala Lumpur.

The company claims to be a leading provider of skills for implementing the Energy Components solution of the vendor Tieto Norway.  Hytracc Consulting was founded in 2010 and has recorded a revenue in excess of NOK 118 million in its second fiscal year 2011. The Owners Dividend was NOK 43 million that year. As of 2013, Hytracc Consulting has more than 50 employees worldwide.

On 5 August 2014, Accenture announced in a joint release that it has entered into an agreement to acquire Hytracc Consulting, while the terms of the transaction were not disclosed.

Notes and references

References

Software companies of Norway